Flocafé is a Greek franchise coffee house chain and belongs to Vivartia, a nutrition conglomerate brand that owns several similar franchises. 

With the cooperation of the Flokas family from Metsovo, well known for their pastry shops in Thessaloniki since the late 19th century, and the founders of Goody's, they opened its first outlet in Athens in 1994. It now operates over 80 coffee houses in the Balkan peninsula, Cyprus and on several cruise ships.
In 2006 it held a 10.2% of the Greek market share. Free internet is provided by Vodafone.

In 2013, plans were announced to open 10 branches in Libya.

Stores
These were the stores of Flocafé as December 2018:

See also
 List of coffeehouse chains
 
 Goody's Burger House (restaurant)

References

Coffeehouses and cafés in Greece
Coffee brands
Greek brands
Vivartia